"Irony" is the debut single by South Korean girl group Wonder Girls, written and produced by Park Jin-young. It was released as the lead single from their debut album The Wonder Years on February 13, 2007, through JYP Entertainment. The song was released as a maxi single titled The Wonder Begins with two B-side tracks: "Bad Boy", "It's Not Love", as well as a remix version of "Irony". An accompanying music video was also released and shows Sohee, Yeeun, Sunmi and Hyuna's revenge on Sunye's unfaithful boyfriend by using a voodoo doll to embarrass him. It marks their only release to feature member Hyuna, who left the group in July 2007.

Versions
"Irony" was pre-released on Melon on February 6, 2007. The original studio version featuring the original line-up (Min Sunye, Park Yeeun, Lee Sunmi, Kim Hyuna and Ahn Sohee) is available on the Wonder Girls' debut extended play The Wonder Begins and their debut studio album The Wonder Years. The song was later re-recorded for the Japanese release of their greatest hits album WonderBest and features the line-up consisting of Min Sunye, Park Yeeun, Ahn Sohee, Kim Yubin and Woo Hyerim, with former members' vocals removed.

Critical reception
Popular music critics Jeong Seong-ha, Han Dong-yoon, Yoon Jee-hoon of Korean web magazine IZM gave "Irony" unfavorable reviews, pointing out the lack of innovation in the song's production as similar musical tendencies of Park Jin-young have already been heard through works of various older artists including g.o.d and Rain.

Music video
A music video was produced for "Irony" to promote the song. Wonder Girls showed the first live performance of "Irony" at the MBC TV series Music Core on February 10, 2007. The video begins by showing Yeeun lying on the floor in a phone conversation, Hyuna petting a dog, Sunmi applying nail paint and Sohee in the upper bunk bed listening to music. Then Sunye, who shows a depressed expression, enters the house. Her groupmates sit around her and Sunye starts singing about the problems with her cheating boyfriend. Sunmi then locates him through their computer, Sohee activates a satellite dish for further remote surveillance and Hyuna uses a voodoo doll to embarrass him in front of his new girlfriend. The girls later enter the club in which he is with his friends and face them. Sunye them blows him away and he falls down the wall. Video ends by girls laughing at him and walking away.

Track listing

Charts and sales
The chart positions are based on data from Music Industry Association Korea. Unlike Oricon and Billboard, the charts are released monthly, not weekly.

Monthly charts

Yearly charts

Sales

References

External links 
 "The Wonder Begins" at Naver Music 

2007 debut singles
JYP Entertainment singles
Korean-language songs
Wonder Girls songs
2007 songs
Songs written by Park Jin-young